Ali Jokar is an Iranian football defender, who currently plays for Al-Shahania.

Club career

Club career statistics

References

External links
 
 
 

Living people
Umm Salal SC players
Al-Shamal SC players
Al-Shahania SC players
Iranian footballers
Qatar Stars League players
Qatari Second Division players
1983 births
Association football fullbacks
People from Shiraz
Sportspeople from Fars province